Tania Maree Kernaghan (born 18 July 1968) is an Australian country music singer.

During her career, Tania has earned fifteen number one radio hits singles, numerous awards, sell out concerts and record sales in the hundreds of thousands. She has also performed at the Grand Ole Opry in Nashville.

Tania is Vice Patron for Riding for the Disabled Association Australia (RDA).

Career
In 1992, Kernaghan released her first single, "I'll Be Gone".

Her first album, December Moon, was released in January 1996. It was nominated for Best Country Album at the ARIA Music Awards of 1996. The album was certified Gold by ARIA in 1997 and Platinum in 1998.

At the time of releasing her fourth album Higher Ground in 2005, Tania started her own record label, KCR.

Tania is an accomplished and well-known horsewoman and an acclaimed keynote speaker which she presents at various functions across Australia.

Discography

Studio albums

Compilation albums

Awards and nominations

AIR Awards
The Australian Independent Record Awards (commonly known informally as AIR Awards) is an annual awards night to recognise, promote and celebrate the success of Australia's Independent Music sector.

|-
| AIR Awards of 2009
|Livin' the Dream 
| Best Independent Country Album
| 
|-

ARIA Music Awards
The ARIA Music Awards are a set of annual ceremonies presented by Australian Recording Industry Association (ARIA), which recognise excellence, innovation, and achievement across all genres of the music of Australia. They commenced in 1987. 

! 
|-
| 1996 || December Moon || ARIA Award for Best Country Album ||  || 
|-
| 1999 || Dancing on Water || Best Country Album ||  ||

Country Music Awards of Australia
The Country Music Awards of Australia (CMAA) (also known as the Golden Guitar Awards) is an annual awards night held in January during the Tamworth Country Music Festival, celebrating recording excellence in the Australian country music industry. They have been held annually since 1973.
 (wins only)
|-
|rowspan=3| 1997
| December Moon
| Album of the Year
| 
|-
| Tania Kernaghan for "Where the Murray Meets the Darling "
| Female Vocalist of the Year
| 
|-
| "A Bushman Can't Survive" with Lee Kernaghan
| Vocal Collaboration of the Year
| 
|-
| 1998
| Tania Kernaghan for "Dunroamin' Station"
| Female Vocalist of the Year
| 
|-
| 1999
| Tania Kernaghan
| Hands of Fame
|

Tamworth Songwriters Awards
The Tamworth Songwriters Association (TSA) is an annual songwriting contest for original country songs, awarded in January at the Tamworth Country Music Festival. They commenced in 1986.
 (wins only)
|-
| 1997
| "Where the Murray Meets the Darling" by Tania Kernaghan
| Songmaker Award
|

Other projects 
Tania is a presenter for Lifestyle TV Program What's Up Downunder which currently airs on Channel 10, One Digital, Southern Cross and numerous regional affiliates .

She also had a part in the film 'Shadows of the Past' playing the role of Sally Robson. And in 2019 appeared in Australian Indie Movie, An Unconventional Love

Tania is Ambassador for Outback Queensland Tourism Association and Board Member

References

External links
 Official Homepage

1968 births
Living people
APRA Award winners
Australian country singers
Australian women singers
People from Albury, New South Wales
20th-century Australian women singers
21st-century Australian singers